Gymnothorax prismodon is a moray eel found in the eastern central Pacific Ocean. It is commonly known as the sawtooth moray.

References

prismodon
Fish described in 2000